Sheikh Sultan II bin Saqr Al Qasimi was the Ruler of Sharjah, a Trucial State and now one of the United Arab Emirates, from 1924 to 1951. His father having ceded the rule of Sharjah to Khalid bin Ahmad Al Qasimi, Sultan found himself dispossessed and married the daughter of Abdulrahman bin Shamsi, the headman of Al Heera. Buoyed by Khalid's unpopularity and Abdulrahman's force of personality and arms, Sultan deposed Khalid and became Ruler of Sharjah. However, he found the interior of the country dominated by Bedouin tribes and the East coast increasingly dominated by the former Ruler, Khalid bin Ahmad, leaving Sultan the effective ruler of a cluster of coastal settlements, many of which constantly tried to secede from his rule. He is cited as having presided over a low ebb in the power of the Al Qasimi, formerly a powerful maritime federation.

Accession 
Sultan's father, Saqr bin Khalid Al Qasimi, died while Sultan was still a young boy. Shortly before his death, he agreed that Khalid bin Ahmad Al Qasimi (his senior cousin) should become Ruler. Khalid acceded in 1914.

Sultan bin Saqr, on reaching his majority, petitioned Khalid for the restitution of the property and money that he had seized on assuming power, but in vain. Embittered, Sultan left Sharjah in 1921 and settled in Dubai. In 1923, he married the daughter of Abdulrahman bin Muhammad Al Shamsi the headman of Al Heera, a dependency of Sharjah that had been embroiled in open conflict with both the Rulers of Sharjah and Ajman.

Khalid bin Ahmad Al Qasimi took this as a challenge and attacked Sultan's father-in-law at his home in Al Heera. Following an intercession by the British Resident Agent, Abdulrahman quit Al Heera and went to live in Dubai with Sultan.

By now, the people of Sharjah had had enough. Khalid was unpopular and was seen as weak, having lost Ras Al Khaimah and oppressed Heera. His actions towards Sultan, as the son of the former ruler, were widely deprecated and his taxes and levies were resented. On 1 November 1924, Sultan bin Saqr was welcomed into Sharjah and, acting with the support of Abdulrahman and his forces, deposed Khalid in an 11-day conflict.

Rule 
Although removed as Ruler of Sharjah, Khalid had considerable influence over Sharjah's eastern dependencies, Dhaid, Dibba and Kalba. On taking control of Sharjah, Sultan bin Saqr removed Khalid's brother Rashid bin Ahmad as wali of Dibba. However, he was restored in 1926 after leading a popular revolt and remained as wali until his death in 1937.

In June 1927, following a brief and bloody fight in Sharjah between forces loyal to Khalid bin Ahmad and forces loyal to Sultan bin Saqr, an agreement was reached between Sultan and Khalid to provide for the upkeep of the deposed ruler's family. This ceded the fort at Dhaid and the revenues of the inland oasis town to Khalid bin Ahmad. Dhaid, in 1906, generated some 228 Marie Theresa Dollars annually in water rates, as well as revenue from the sale of dates.

Although he had Sultan bin Saqr's agreement, Khalid remained in Umm Al Qawain and sent some of his men to Dhaid to occupy his newly acquired property as the Bedouin who had manned the fort for Sultan were still active in the area. With the support of the Sheikhs of the Bedouin Bani Ka'ab and Na'im tribes, who favoured any scheme which would weaken Sharjah, it was agreed that the ruler of Ras Al Khaimah, Sultan bin Salim Al Qasimi, would possess Dhaid 'on behalf of Khaled bin Ahmad'. This arrangement was not fully supported by Sultan bin Salim himself, who feared antagonising Sultan bin Saqr and also believed Khalid bin Ahmad would represent an ongoing financial burden with little hope of any return other than conflict.

Khalid bin Ahmad finally took full possession of Dhaid in his own right in July 1928.

Abdulrahman Al Shamsi 

Sultan's father-in-law was, to say the least, a colourful figure and in October 1925 was accused of the murder of the cousin of the Residency Agent. Although it wasn't doubted that Abdulrahman disliked the man, there was scant proof of his involvement in the murder and the British sent the Political Resident (accompanied by the Bahraini trader, Yousuf Kanoo) to Sharjah to investigate. They concluded that Abdulrahman was responsible. This caused an increasing outcry and outbreak of tension between the Al Bu Shamis and other leaders on the coast.

Due to the increase in tensions and consequent instability, the British Political Resident decided to exile Abdulrahman to Aden for four years. Captain Parry of the Triad was sent to Ras Al Khaimah to disembark Abdulrahman, but Sultan bin Salim Al Qasimi, the Ruler, refused to give Abdulrahman up until the British had issued barely veiled threats to bombard the coastal towns, including Al Heerah and Sharjah. On 16 June 1926, Abdulrahman was given up to go into exile but in 1929 he was permitted to return after a sustained outcry led by Sultan bin Saqr and the leaders of the Al Bu Shamis.

Abdulrahman was to be a staunch and helpful ally to Sultan, who was seen as weak by many of the uncompromising and warlike chiefs of Bedouin tribes such as the Bani Qitab, who declared war on Sultan but who were allied to Abdulrahman. When war broke out between Sharjah and Ajman in 1933, Abdulrahman brought the Bani Qitab and Manasir to fight on Sharjah's side. This didn't stop the Bani Qitab, who were paramount across much of the interior of the peninsula, in 1936 blocking geologists from Petroleum Concessions from exploring the interior, even though they held permits from Sultan. Eventually Sultan was to petition his predecessor, Khalid bin Ahmad Al Qasimi, to intercede on his behalf with the Bani Qitab – Khalid having become a highly influential leader amongst the tribes of the East Coast. However, this was not successful, Sultan remaining in effective control by 1937 of only the Western coastal area of Sharjah.

Abdulrahman's powerful personality and position appear to have given him a dominant role in his relationship with Sultan, who came to resent his father-in-law - especially when he declared Al Heera independent of Sharjah. He attempted to have Abdulrahman ostracised by other leaders but to no avail and it was only on Abdulrahman's death that Al Heera was confirmed as a part of the territory of Sharjah.

East Coast 
Sultan bin Saqr's 18th century namesake had established Al Qasimi dominance over the east coast, the area known as the Shamaliyah but the Al Qasimi relationship with the dominant tribe of Fujairah, the Sharqiyin, was fractious and the Sharqiyin on a number of occasions moved to secede from Sharjah, but also to encroach on the territory of Kalba. In 1926, strained relations boiled over into open conflict between Kalba and Fujairah. A number of tribal affiliations were brought into the fray and Sharjah, Muscat and Ras Al Khaimah were all involved in what looked to be escalating into a major tribal conflict. The involvement of the Sultan of Muscat led to an agreement agreed by all parties and peace broke out, only to be threatened again in 1927. By 1936, the grant of Trucial Status to Kalba by the British and the establishment of stable rule over Kalba by Khalid bin Ahmad Al Qasimi stabilised the situation.

Sharjah Airport 

An air route to connect the British empire was established by Imperial Airways, running from Croydon via Cairo to Cape Town in South Africa and Brisbane in Australia. The agreement to use a base on the Persian coast lapsed in 1932 and a Southern route was subsequently sought. Negotiations with several Trucial Sheikhs resulted in British offers being rejected before, finally, Sultan bin Saqr agreed – with reservations – to host the airfield. An agreement was made on 22 June 1932 with Sultan bin Saqr, which secured him a monthly rental of 800 Rupees for landing rights and fees and a personal subsidy of 500 Rupees. Concerned that the airfield would result in British interference in Sharjah's internal affairs, he also gained assurances that British shipping would route through Sharjah, providing income for the town's traders.

He agreed to build a rest-house for crew and passengers which was fortified against "possible but unlikely raids by bedouin" according to the 1937 documentary film Air Outpost, which featured Sharjah's airport. Sultan also supplied a number of armed men as guards.

The route was originally flown by Handley Page H.P.42s, with two weekly flights landing in Sharjah on Sunday and Wednesday evenings on the outbound flight and Wednesday and Saturday evenings on the return flight. A backup landing strip was established in Kalba in August 1936.

By 1938, Sharjah was no longer an overnight stop on the route although the Imperial Airways flying boat service from Sydney to London included an overnight stop in Dubai, following the establishment of Civil Air Agreements with Dubai's ruler. The outbreak of skirmishing between Dubai and usurpers who had escaped to Al Khan in Sharjah in 1940 threatened the security of Sharjah's airport and led to unusual intervention by the British political agent in a land-based dispute: the British had previously restricted their interests and treaties purely to maritime affairs. That same year, the British agent reported that were attempts to disseminate pro-Nazi German sentiments in Sharjah by members of the Sheikh's court, which, however, were promptly stopped after British verbal intervention.

The airport was used extensively during World War II by the RAF and a new agreement was made with Sultan to establish an RAF base in Sharjah.

Secession 
Sultan's rule was plagued by attempts at secession, not only by Al Heera, but also Kalba, Dibba, Fujairah, Dhaid, Al Khan and Hamriyah. Having lost the effective control of the East coast and the interior, he relied on British interventions in order to retain control even of his diminished coastal holding. In trying to allow access to the interior for geologists exploring for oil under the terms of concessions he had signed, he was forced to ask Khalid bin Ahmad for help in pacifying the tribes of the East Coast and interior, particularly the Bani Qitab, paying Khalid 1500 Rupees for his intercession.

Sultan bin Saqr died in 1951.

Saqr, his son lost the throne in 1965, but since 1999 the crown prince is Sultan bin Muhammad, his direct grandson again, and also Ahmad, his son was deputy ruler 1990-2020 (his death, but "succeeded" by son Sultan) and was also UAE justice minister in 1972–76.

References

Sheikhs of the Emirate of Sharjah
House of Al Qasimi
History of the United Arab Emirates